Schofer or Schöfer is a German surname. Notable people with the surname include:

 Jeff Schofer (born 1943), New Zealand cricketer
 Joseph Schofer, American civil engineer
 Phil Schofer (born 1948), New Zealand cricketer

German-language surnames